The Macedonian Society or Secret Macedonian Committee was secret organization established in 1885 by Macedonian Slavs in Sofia, Bulgaria, to promote a kind of pro-Serbian Slav Macedonian identity, distinguished especially from the ethnic identity of the Bulgarians, the establishment of the Archbishopric of Ohrid separate from the Bulgarian Exarchate and the promotion of the Macedonian language with strong Serbian linguistic influence. Its leaders were Naum Evrov, Kosta Grupčev, Vasilij Karajovev and Temko Popov. They were sent to Sofia from Belgrade. At that time the main postulates of the Serbian policy towards Macedonia as Bulgarophobia, anti-Exarchism and serbianization of the Macedonian dialects, were promoted by various organizations financed by the Serbian government.

In 1886 the Bulgarian government revealеd the organization and it was disbanded. Its leaders went in the same year back to Belgrade, where the Government of Serbia established a cooperation with that ephemeral Macedonian Society. Through support to the Macedonian movement the Government of Serbia had intention to suppress the process of Bulgarization of Macedonian Christian Slavs or to debulgarize them. In accordance with the Serbo-Macedonian cooperation in the same year in Constantinople was founded the Association of Serbo-Macedonians. This compromise with the Serbian interests in Macedonia, led it later to abandonment of its separatist program altogether. As result, later its members promoted already only pro-Serbian ideas.

References 

History of North Macedonia
Macedonian writers' organizations
Anti-Bulgarian sentiment
19th century in Serbia
Macedonia under the Ottoman Empire
Organizations established in 1885
Macedonian nationalism